The 2018 Telekom S-League is the 15th season of the Telekom S-League, the top football league in the Solomon Islands.

The league was originally to kick off on 21 July 2018, but was delayed to 5 August. A total of eight teams have confirmed their participation.

League table

References

Solomon Islands S-League seasons
Solomon Islands
1